Lukas Gabriel (born 26 December 1991) is an Austrian professional footballer who plays for Austrian Regionalliga club Hertha Wels. He plays as a centre back.

He previously played five matches in the Austrian Football Bundesliga for Ried, and in the Regional League for Wels and FC Pasching.

Career

Hertha Wels
Ahead of the 2019/20 season, Gabriel joined Austrian Regionalliga club WSC Hertha Wels.

References

External links

1991 births
Living people
Austrian footballers
Association football defenders
SV Ried players
FC Wels players
ASKÖ Pasching players
FC Juniors OÖ players
FC Blau-Weiß Linz players
SK Vorwärts Steyr players
Austrian Football Bundesliga players
Austrian Regionalliga players